Roger David (born 15 October 1979), better known by his stage name Bohemia is a Pakistani-American Punjabi language rapper, singer, songwriter and record producer.

Personal life
Bohemia was born in Karachi, Sindh and received his education in Peshawar, Khyber Pakhtunkhwa. At the age of 13, he moved to the United States with his family. Bohemia is married to Sunny David.

Career
In early 2000, he moved to join his cousin in Oakland who was working at a West Oakland recording studio and introduced him to a young hip-hop producer called Sha One (Seth Agress). Discovering that they both shared a deep interest in music, they made plans to form their own record label, which they subsequently called "The Outfit Entertainment". After Sha heard Bohemia reciting something he had written in Punjabi he asked him to rap it over one of his beats. Over the next few months, he wrote a library of lyrics. This would become the arsenal for his debut album Vich Pardesan De (In The Foreign Land) – an autobiographical story of his life as a Desi youngster adopting to the streets of America, which he and Sha One produced together. Their first single "Sha Te Ra" was released as a music video, but the song itself was not included on Vich Pardesan De.

The following album, Pesa Nasha Pyar [Money, Intoxication, Love] became the first full-length Punjabi rap album released by a major label. It was recorded and produced by Sha One and Bohemia in their downtown Oakland studio. After nearly two years of perfecting their sound and style, a seamless fusion of Bohemia's Punjabi vocals, and Sha One's English hooks, the album was finally released. He subsequently signed a multi-record deal with music label Universal Music Group. In 2006, Pesa Nasha Pyar was on the Top 10 downloads of Maxim, and No. 3 on Planet M chart India. His first album Vich Pardesan De get nominated in BBC UK top ten albums. Da Rap Star, his third album, received four nominations at the UK Asian Music Awards and PTC Punjabi music awards. It also remained at No. 1 on Planet M chart for several weeks.

He performed the title track for Warner Bros film Chandni Chowk To China, appearing in the film with Akshay Kumar and Deepika Padukone. A few months later he did the title track for another Akshay Kumar film, 8 x 10 Tasveer. In 2011, he gave a song as a present to Akshay Kumar for his first Hollywood production Breakaway.

In May 2012, Sony Music India signed Bohemia. As part of the association, Sony Music managed his music albums, launches and shows under its 
management program.

In September 2012 he released his fourth album Thousand Thoughts. In 2013, it won Best Non-Resident Punjabi Album award at PTC Punjabi Music Awards. At the Coke Studio Sessions, he was the first rap artist, appearing in their fifth season where he performed three songs. Bohemia has also recorded a collaboration with Sonu Kakkar and Jamaican American artist Sean Kingston.

In 2015, Bohemia launched his own music label Kali Denali Music. Bohemia appeared in XXL magazine in New York.

In 2017, Bohemia released his latest album Skull & Bones: The Final Chapter.

On July 26, 2018, first single "Sandesa" from his EP "Skull & Bones: Volume 2" was released, which turned out to be a remixed version of one of his unreleased singles. On November 27, 2018, Bohemia released first original single "Koi Farak Nahi" for his EP Skull & Bones: Volume 2. In an interview Bohemia said that he is coming back with his brand new album Skull and Bones Volume 2 which later got released as an EP. All the songs in it were got released as singles instead of a single unit album.

At the end of 2018, Bohemia went on a tour in India, where he performed in Chandigarh, Delhi, Mumbai, and Rajasthan. He also appeared on an Episode on No.1 Yaarian With Raftaar and Salim Merchant.

In February 2019 Bohemia released the third single "Umeed" from his EP Skull and Bones Volume 2.

On March 6, 2022, Bohemia announced his upcoming fifth studio album named as "I Am I.C.O.N" with the track list too.

Awards and nominations

|-
| style="text-align:center;"|2010
| style="text-align:center;"|"Da Rap Star"
| Best Punjabi Album at PTC Punjabi Music Awards
|
|-
| style="text-align:center;"|2010
| style="text-align:center;"|"Da Rap Star"
| Best Sound Recording at PTC Punjabi Music Awards
|
|-
| style="text-align:center;"|2010
| style="text-align:center;"|"Da Rap Star"
| Best Punjabi Music Director at PTC Punjabi Music Awards
|
|-
| style="text-align:center;"|2010
| style="text-align:center;"|"Da Rap Star"
| Best International Album at UK Asian Music Awards
|
|-
| style="text-align:center;"|2013
| style="text-align:center;"|"Thousand Thoughts"
| Best International Album at PTC Punjabi Music Awards
| 
|-
| style="text-align:center;"|2015
| style="text-align:center;"|"Excellence Music"
| Award of Excellence - Music at Festival Of Globe
| 
|-
|style="text-align:center;"|2015
| style="text-align:center;"| "Music Career"
| Make it large at Mirchi Music Awards Punjabi 
| 
|-
| style="text-align:center;"|2016
| style="text-align:center;"|"Jaguar"
| Best Duo at PTC Punjabi Music Awards
| 
|-
| style="text-align:center;"|2016
| style="text-align:center;"|"Patola"
| Best Duo at PTC Punjabi Music Awards
| 
|-  style="text-align:left;"

| style="text-align:center;"|2017
| style="text-align:center;"|"Hathiyar 2"
| Best Duo at PTC Punjabi Music Awards
| 
|-
| style="text-align:center;"|2018
| style="text-align:center;"|"Special Award"
| International Punjabi Icon at PTC Punjabi Music Awards
| 
|-
| style="text-align:center;"|2020
| style="text-align:center;"|"Pagol"
| Best Music Video at PTC Music Awards
|

Discography

Studio albums

Mixtapes

Singles discography

As lead artist

As featured artist

Coke Studio 
 School Di Kitaab
 Paisay Da Nasha
 Kandyaari Dhol Geet
 Saari Duniya

MTV Spoken Word 
 Purana Wala
 Jaane Jana

Film soundtracks

References

External links
 

Pakistani emigrants to the United States
Living people
American rappers of Asian descent
Pakistani rappers
Punjabi rappers
Rappers from California
21st-century American rappers
Year of birth missing (living people)